African giant squirrels (genus Protoxerus) form a taxon of squirrels under the subfamily Xerinae. They are only found in Africa.

The two subgenera of African giant squirrels each has a single species:
Subgenus Protoxerus -  forest giant squirrel or Stanger's squirrel, P. stangeri
Subgenus Allosciurus - slender-tailed squirrel, P. aubinnii

References

 
Rodents of Africa
Taxa named by Charles Immanuel Forsyth Major